Cowboy shooting may refer to:

Cowboy Action Shooting
Cowboy Mounted Shooting